The Capitol Hill Occupied Protest or the Capitol Hill Organized Protest (CHOP), originally Free Capitol Hill and later the Capitol Hill Autonomous Zone (CHAZ), was an occupation protest and self-declared autonomous zone in the Capitol Hill neighborhood of Seattle, Washington. The zone, originally covering two intersections at the corners of Cal Anderson Park and the roads leading up to them, was established on June 8, 2020, by George Floyd protesters after the Seattle Police Department (SPD) left its East Precinct building. The zone was cleared of occupants by police on July 1. Its formation was preceded by a week of tense interactions between protesters and police in riot gear which began on June 1 and escalated on June 7 after a man drove his vehicle toward a crowd near 11th Avenue and Pine Street and shot a protester who tried to stop him. Tear gas, flashbangs and pepper spray were used by police in the densely populated residential neighborhood. On June 7, the SPD reported that the crowd was throwing rocks, bottles, and fireworks, and were shining green lasers into officers' eyes. The next day, SPD boarded up its building and moved out of the East Precinct in an effort to de-escalate the situation.

The zone was a self-organized space, without official leadership. Protesters asserted three main demands:

 Cut Seattle's $409-million police budget by 50%.
 Shift funding to community programs and services in historically black communities.
 Ensure that protesters would not be charged with crimes.

Participants created a block-long "Black Lives Matter" mural, provided free film screenings in the street, and performed live music. A "No Cop Co-op" was formed, with food, hand sanitizer and other supplies. Areas were set up for free speech and to facilitate discourse, and a community vegetable garden was constructed.

The CHOP became a focus of national attention when President Donald Trump tweeted his disapproval on June 10 and 11, calling the occupants "ugly Anarchists" and demanding that Governor Jay Inslee and Mayor Jenny Durkan "take back" the zone. Durkan described the area on June 11 as four blocks with a "block party" atmosphere; on June 14, USA Today reported a festive environment and compared the protest to a miniature version of Burning Man. The New York Times later contrasted Durkan's words with descriptions provided by local businesspeople, reporting "encampments overtaking the sidewalks ... roving bands of masked protesters smashing windows and looting [and] [y]oung white men wielding guns ... harangu[ing] customers." The Star Tribune reported on June 22 that at night, the atmosphere became charged as demonstrators marched and armed volunteer guards kept watch. SPD Chief Carmen Best said that the department wanted to reduce its footprint, later clarifying that officials intended to return officers to the precinct to respond quickly to calls.

On June 13, Black Lives Matter protesters negotiated with local officials about leaving the zone. The CHOP's size decreased four days later (when roadblocks were moved), and it continued to shrink after shootings in or near the zone on June 20, 21, and 23. Durkan responded that the SPD would return peacefully in the near future. On June 28, she met with protesters and informed them that the city planned to remove most barricades and limit the activist area to the East Precinct building and the street in front of it. That day, CHOP organizers expressed their intention to refocus on the area near the police station and away from the sprawling encampment at Cal Anderson Park after it became a political liability and they struggled to maintain security. In the early morning of June 29, a fourth shooting left a 16-year-old boy dead and a 14-year-old boy in critical condition with gunshot wounds. Calling the situation "dangerous and unacceptable", Best told reporters: "Enough is enough. We need to be able to get back into the area." On July 1, after Durkan issued an executive order, Seattle police cleared the area of protesters and reclaimed its East Precinct station. Protests continued in Seattle and at the CHOP site over the following days and months.

Several business owners sued the city in 2020 for damages relating to government conduct during the protests. A federal judge found that the mayor, police chief, and other government officials then illegally deleted tens of thousands of text messages relating to government handling of CHOP. In 2022, the city settled a lawsuit with the Seattle Times for $200,000 over its handling of deleted texts and agreed to improve its record-keeping practices.

Background 

Capitol Hill is a densely populated residential district on a steep hill just east of Seattle's downtown business district, known for its prominent LGBT and counterculture communities and its vibrant nightlife. The Seattle Police Department had been protested against in the past. In 1965, during the civil rights movement after an unarmed black man was shot by an SPD officer, community leaders followed police in "freedom patrols" to observe (and record) their interactions with the Black community. Since 2012, the SPD had been under federal oversight after it had been found to use excessive force and biased policing.

Seattle had been the location of other mass protests, such as the 1999 WTO protests and Occupy Seattle. The city is home to several cultural institutions created by occupation protests, including the Northwest African American Museum, the Daybreak Star Cultural Center and El Centro de la Raza.

Protests over the murder of George Floyd and police brutality began in Seattle on May 29, 2020. Street clashes occurred in greater Seattle for nine days involving protesters, the Seattle Police Department, the Washington State Patrol and the Washington National Guard.

Capitol Hill clashes (June 1–8) 
The zone's formation was preceded by a week of tense interactions in the Capitol Hill neighborhood beginning on June 1, when protesters and police in riot gear began facing off at a police barricade near the SPD's East Precinct building. The SPD used aggressive dispersal tactics, including blast balls, flashbangs and pepper spray. On June 5, Mayor Jenny Durkan and SPD Chief Carmen Best announced a 30-day ban on the use of tear gas.

A group of public representatives (including four City Council-members, a King County Council-member, state Senator Joe Nguyen and state Representative Nicole Macri) joined demonstrators on June 6 on the front lines in response to citizen requests, when officers again used flashbangs and pepper spray to control the crowd.

On June 7, police installed sturdier barricades around the East Precinct and boarded up its windows. The situation intensified after 8 pm, when a demonstrator was shot while trying to slow down a vehicle speeding toward a crowd of 1,000 protesters on 11th Avenue and East Pine Street; the driver left the vehicle with a gun and walked towards the police line, where he was taken into custody without incident. It later became known that the shooter's brother worked at the East Precinct. After midnight on June 8, police reported that protesters were throwing bottles, rocks and fireworks. The SPD resumed the use of tear gas (despite the mayor's ban), and used pepper spray and flashbangs against protesters at 11th and Pine. Over 12,000 complaints were filed about police response to the demonstrations, and members of the Seattle City Council questioned how many weapons had been thrown at police.

Police boarded up and vacated the East Precinct during the afternoon of June 8, which Best described as an effort to "de-escalate the situation and rebuild trust". Protesters (initially suspicious of the SPD's motives) moved into the area, repositioned street barricades in a one-block radius around the station, and declared the area "Free Capitol Hill". It remained unclear days later who had decided to retreat from the East Precinct, since Chief Best did not admit responsibility. Durkan later attributed the decision to withdraw to an unnamed SPD on-scene commander. Over a year later, a KUOW report identified Assistant Chief Tom Mahaffey as the one who made the decision, revealing that he had done so without the knowledge of Best or Durkan.

Territory 

The zone was initially centered around the East Precinct building, and barriers were set up on Pine Street for several blocks to stop incoming vehicles. The early territory reportedly encompassed five-and-a-half city blocks, including Cal Anderson Park (already active with demonstrators). It stretched north to East Denny Way, east to 12th Avenue (and part of 13th Avenue), south to East Pike, and west to Broadway. Protesters used blockades and fences to construct barricades at intersections. On June 9, one entrance to the zone was marked by a barrier reading "You Are Entering Free Capitol Hill". Other signs read, "You are now leaving the USA" and "Welcome to the Capitol Hill Autonomous Zone". Signage on the police station was modified as protesters rebranded it the "Seattle People's Department".

On June 16, after city officials agreed with protest organizers about a new footprint, the Seattle Department of Transportation (SDOT) installed concrete barriers wrapped in plywood in several areas along Pine Street and 10th and 12th Avenues (shrinking the area). The revised barrier spacing provided improved access for business deliveries, and the design offered space for decoration by artists affiliated with the protests. The new layout was posted on Durkan's blog: "The City is committed to maintaining space for community to come to together, protest and exercise their first amendment rights. Minor changes to the protest zone will implement safer and sturdier barriers to protect individuals in this area."

KIRO-FM reported that on June 17, a large tent encampment was set up on 11th Avenue between Pike and Pine Streets and half of Cal Anderson Park "turned into a huge tent encampment with a massive community garden." The zone's borders were not clearly defined, and shifted daily. Its size was reduced over time, with The Seattle Times reporting that the area had "shrunk considerably" by June 24. Demonstrators redirected their focus to the East Precinct on June 23, when "the Capitol Hill protest zone camp cleared parts of its Cal Anderson Park core."

On June 30, police and other city employees removed a number of concrete barricades and concentrated others closer to the East Precinct. That day, notices were posted announcing a noon closure of Cal Anderson Park for cleaning and repairs; the garden and art created by protesters would be undisturbed. The remaining territory was cleared by Seattle police on July 1, and Cal Anderson Park was reportedly closed for repairs.

Culture and amenities

Services 

Protesters established the No Cop Co-op on June 9, offering free water, hand sanitizer, kebabs and snacks donated by the community. Stalls offered vegan curry, and others collected donations for the homeless. Organizers pitched tents next to the former precinct to hold the space. Two medical stations were established in the zone to provide basic health care, and the Seattle Department of Transportation provided portable toilets. The city provided waste removal, additional portable toilets and fire and rescue services, and the SPD said that it responded to 911 calls in the zone. The King County public health department provided COVID-19 testing in Cal Anderson Park for a period of time during the protests.

On June 11, The Seattle Times reported that restaurant owners in the area had an uptick in walk-up business and a corresponding reduction in delivery costs. USA Today reported three days later that most businesses in the zone had closed, "although a liquor store, ramen restaurant and taco joint are still doing brisk business." According to The New York Times, "business crashed". Some activists lived in tents inside the zone. Outside the zone, urban camping is illegal in Seattle but the law was seldom enforced.

Community gardens 
Vegetable gardens had materialized by June 11 in Cal Anderson Park, where activists began to grow a variety of foods from seedlings. The gardens were inaugurated with a basil plant introduced by Marcus Henderson, a resident of Seattle's Columbia City neighborhood. Activists expanded the gardens, which were "cultivated by and for BIPOC" and included signs heralding black agriculturalists and commemorating victims of police violence. Henderson established his gardening movement as Black Star Farmers, and after the dissipation of the CHOP launched a GoFundMe to continue the work. After the park was cleared on July 1, he called supporters of the garden to help him advocate to the city that they allow it to remain as the Black Lives Memorial Garden. The effort succeeded as perhaps the least controversial proposition for how to make use of the public space in Cal Anderson Park after the CHOP's closure. The gardens are still in their original location as of September 2022.

Discourse

Arts and culture 

The intersection of 12th and Pine was converted into a square for teach-ins (where a microphone was used for organizing) and to encourage those with destructive intentions to leave the area. An area at 11th and Pine was set aside as the "Decolonization Conversation Café", a discussion area with daily topics. An outdoor cinema with a sound system and projector was set up on June 9 and screened films, including 13th (a 2016 documentary by Ava DuVernay about racism and mass incarceration) and Paris Is Burning, a 1990 documentary by Jennie Livingston.

The Marshall Law Band (a Seattle-based hip-hop fusion group) began performing for protesters during the week of June 1 - June 8 when protesters were confronting police at what was known as "the Western barricade" due to it being one block West of the entrance to the East Precinct. During this week, they played several hour sets with a sign of the protest demands near the stage every single night. The stage was close enough to the barricade that at times when relations between the protesters and cops got violent the band found themselves in the line of fire. They kept performing, even when there was tear gas in the air and rubber bullets being fired. The band continued playing regularly once the CHOP was established. In November 2020, Marshall Law Band released an album called 12th & Pine about their experience as the "House band of the CHOP".

A block-long Black Lives Matter street mural, on East Pine Street between 10th and 11th Avenues, was painted on June 10 and 11. Individual letters of the mural were painted by local artists of color, and supplies were purchased with donations from demonstrators and passersby.

Shrines 
Visitors lit candles and left flowers at three shrines with photographs and notes expressing sentiments related to George Floyd and other victims of police brutality. Persons for whom shrines, murals, and/or vigils were created:

On June 19, events ranging from a "grief ritual" to a dance party were held to observe Juneteenth.

Internal governance 

Occupants of the zone favored consensus decision-making in the form of general assembly, with daily meetings and discussion groups an alternative to designated leaders. According to City Journal on June 10, former mayoral candidate Nikkita Oliver had a major role in the zone.

Observers described early zone activity on June 11 as a hybrid of other movements, with an atmosphere which was "part protest, part commune"; a cross between "a sit-in, a protest and summer festival"; or a blend of "Occupy Wall Street and a college cooperative dorm." According to a June 16 Vox article, CHOP had evolved into "a center of peaceful protest, free political speech, co-ops, and community gardens" after protesters recovered from their initial confusion over the police decision to leave the precinct.

Protesters held frequent town hall meetings to decide strategy and make plans. Seattle officials said that they saw no evidence of antifa groups organizing in the zone, but some small-business owners blamed antifa for violence and intimidating their patrons. SPD Chief Carmen Best said on June 15, "There is no cop-free zone in the city of Seattle", indicating that officers would go into the zone if there were threats to public safety. "I think that the picture has been painted in many areas that shows the city is under siege," she added. "That is not the case." On August 7, The New York Times described the zone as police abolition in practice, reporting that police generally did not respond to calls in the zone.

Misinformation about its governance circulated. Conservative social-media personality Andy Ngo shared a video on June 15 of Seattle-based hip hop artist Raz Simone handing a rifle from the trunk of his car to another protester on June 8 (the day the zone was established) after "rumors developed [within the Zone] that members of the right-wing group Proud Boys were going to move into the protest area to set fires and stir chaos." CNN later called Simone the zone's "de facto leader", which he denied. Unbeknownst to the public at the time, Raz was in contact with Seattle Fire Chief Harold Scoggins during his time in CHOP. Simone left the area around July 15.

Names for the area 

The protest area had several names; the Capitol Hill Autonomous Zone (CHAZ) was most common at the outset, along with "Free Capitol Hill". By its second week, the area was more often referred to as the Capitol Hill Organized Protest (CHOP).

On June 13, a group of several dozen protest leaders agreed to change the name from CHAZ to CHOP. The name change was the result of a consensus to de-emphasize occupation and improve accuracy. According to TechCrunch, participants decided to change the name to "the Capitol Hill Occupied Protest—then, noting the fact that Seattle itself is an 'occupation' of native land, change the O to Organized." During the second week of formation, a number of media outlets reported on the name change including The Seattle Times on June 14; King5, KUOW, The Stranger, and the Seattle Post-Intelligencer on June 15; Vox on June 16; and Crosscut on June 17.

Demands 
The number of demands was debated; some believed that the protests were the beginning of a larger revolution, and others said that police brutality should remain the immediate focus. The protesters settled on three main demands:
 Reducing city-police funding by 50%
 Redistribute funds to community efforts, such as restorative justice and health care
 Ensure that protesters would not be criminally liable

Other demands by the collective included:

 Reallocation of SPD funds to community health:
 Socialized health and medicine
 Free public housing
 Public education
 Naturalization services for undocumented immigrants; "no person is illegal"
 General community development (parks, etc.)
 The release of prisoners serving time for marijuana-related offenses or resisting arrest, and the expungement of their records
 Mandatory retrials for people of color imprisoned for violent crimes
 Educational reform, increasing the focus on Black and Native American history 
 Rent control to reverse gentrification
 Free college

One early list (released June 9 in a Medium post attributed to "The Collective Black Voices at Free Capitol Hill") outlined 30 demands, beginning with the abolition of the Seattle Police Department, the armed forces, and prisons. The collective made other demands:

On June 10, about 1,000 protesters marched into Seattle City Hall demanding Durkan's resignation.

Declaration of independence 
CHAZ's declaration of independence was ultimately unsuccessful.

Security 

Protesters accepted open carry of firearms as a provision of safety. Members of the self-described anti-fascist, anti-racist and pro-worker Puget Sound John Brown Gun Club (PSJBGC) were reported on June 9 as carrying rifles in the zone in response to rumors of an attack by the right-wing Proud Boys. Although the zone was in the restricted area subject to Durkan's May 30 emergency order prohibiting the use of weapons (including guns), her ban did not mandate enforcement. The Washington Post reported on June 12 that PSJBGC was on site with no visible weapons, and USA Today reported that day that "no one appeared armed with a gun". Reporters from a Tacoma-based Fox affiliate were chased out of the zone by occupants on June 9.

Area businesses hired private protection services, including Iconic Global, Homeland Patrol Division and Fortress Security, during the occupation. The services deployed men and women (some in uniform and others in plainclothes, armed with AR-15 style rifles and pepper spray) to patrol the zone on foot and in SUVs. Volunteers in the area formed an informal group to provide security, emphasizing de-escalation and preventing vandalism.

On June 15, KIRO-TV reported a break-in and fire at an auto shop near the zone to which the SPD did not respond; police chief Carmen Best later said that officers observed the building from a distance and saw no sign of a disturbance. On June 16, Seattle's KIRO-TV quoted an eight-year tenant of an apartment near the East Precinct: "We are just sitting ducks all day. Now every criminal in the city knows they can come into this area and they can do anything they want as long as it isn't life-threatening, and the police won't come in to do anything about it." Frustrated by blocked streets, criminal behavior and lawlessness, some residents moved out and others installed security cameras. A man who said he "100 percent" supported the protest told KOMO-TV, "I don't even feel safe anymore."

On June 18, a volunteer medic intervened during a sexual assault in a tent in the occupied park area; the alleged perpetrator was arrested. NPR reported that day, "Nobody inside the protest zone thinks a police return would end peacefully. Small teams of armed anti-fascists are also present, self-proclaimed community defense forces who say they're ready to fight if needed but that de-escalation is preferred."

The SPD police blotter page listed FBI-reported law-enforcement incidents in the area: 37 incidents in 2019, and 65 incidents through June 30, 2020. Crime in the area from June 2 to June 30 rose 525 percent over the same period in 2019. In addition to two homicides and two non-fatal shootings, the increase included narcotics use, violent crimes (such as rape, robbery, and assault) and increased gang activity.

Outside threats from the Proud Boys and Patriot Prayer 

Since the protest began, protesters were reportedly aware of the threat posed by the far-right groups Patriot Prayer (active in the Pacific Northwest) and the Proud Boys, a national neo-fascist hate group. On June 15, armed members of the Proud Boys appeared in the zone at a Capitol Hill rally. The group intended to confront what it called protesters' "authoritarian behavior", and video of the clashes went viral.

Proud Boys affiliate and brawler Tusitala "Tiny" Toese was filmed in the zone punching a man and breaking his cellphone on June 15. Toese has been known in the Pacific Northwest for fighting as a leader of Patriot Prayer and, after early 2019, as a chauvinist member of the Proud Boys. He has been called "the right-wing protester most frequently arrested in Portland." A Washington State resident, Toese is the subject of several reports by Portland's Willamette Week. He had not been prosecuted for violent offenses (despite his confession and witness confirmations), leading to accusations that law enforcement enables his behavior. Toese was later arrested for violating probation, due to video evidence of assault in the CHOP.

Shootings

Before the zone 
On June 7, the day before the zone's founding, a man drove towards a crowd of protesters. He was intercepted by a protester, who reached into his car and tried to stop him before the driver shot him. The driver then stopped and immediately surrendered to the police. The victim, wounded in his upper right arm, was expected to fully recover within a year. The driver claimed self-defense and was charged with first-degree assault. Prosecutors said that the driver had provoked the incident.

During the zone

June 20 
During the early morning of June 20, two people were shot in separate incidents at the edge of the protest zone. It was unclear if the shootings were connected to the protests. According to Carmen Best, police officers had wanted to reach the scene quicker but were prevented by protesters; however, an analysis by KUOW based on 911 transcripts, video recordings, and eyewitness testimony suggested that miscommunication between the SPD and the Seattle Fire Department slowed the emergency response.

Emergency dispatchers received the first reports of gunshots at 10th Avenue and East Pine Street at 2:19 a.m. A 19-year-old black man, Horace Lorenzo Anderson Jr., was transported to Harborview Medical Center by volunteer medics. With multiple gunshot wounds, he was pronounced dead at 2:53 a.m. A local rapper known as "Lil Mob", Anderson had graduated from high school the previous day. Anderson was publicly mourned by his teachers and mother in the days following his death. On July 20, Donnitta Sinclair Martin, Anderson Jr.’s mother, filed a wrongful death claim against the City of Seattle.

The second victim, 33-year-old, DeJuan Young, was found by a former nurse who determined with the help of a volunteer medic that he had two gunshot wounds. Young reported that he tried to leave after hearing the first shooting and was surrounded by a group of men, called a racist epithet, and shot at 11th and Pike. Transported to Harborview by 3:06 a.m., he was in critical condition the following day. KIRO-TV reported that Young was shot by different people one block from the site of Anderson's shooting. Young said "I was shot by, I'm not sure if they're Proud Boys or KKK, but the verbiage that they said was hold this 'N——' and shot me." He expressed concern that his case was not being investigated due to the perception that protesters had "asked for the police not to be there, so don't act like y'all need them now, but Young was outside the zone when he was shot. "I was in Seattle streets," he said. "So what's the excuse now?"

Armed police eventually entered the zone in riot gear but were informed by protesters that "the victim left the premises". City Council member Lisa Herbold, chair of the public-safety committee, said that the suggestion that the crowd interfered with access to victims "defies belief". Although the SPD reviewed public-source and body-camera video, no suspects were arrested and a motive had not been determined. CHOP representatives alleged that the individuals involved had a history which apparently escalated because of "gang affiliations".

June 21 
Another shooting occurred on June 21, the third in the zone in less than 48 hours. After being transported in a private vehicle to Harborview Medical Center, a 17-year-old male was treated for a gunshot wound to the arm and released; he declined to speak to SPD detectives.

On June 22, Durkan said the violence was distracting from the message of thousands of peaceful protesters. "We cannot let acts of violence define this movement for change," she said, adding that the city "will not allow for gun violence to continue in the evenings around Capitol Hill." Durkan announced that officials were working with the community to end the zone. "It's time for people to go home," she said, "to restore order and eliminate the violence on Capitol Hill." At the same press conference, Best described "groups of individuals engaging in shootings, a rape, assault, burglary, arson and property destruction ... I cannot stand by, not another second, and watch another black man, or anyone really, die in our streets while people aggressively thwart the efforts of police and other first responders from rescuing them."

June 23 
A fourth shooting near the zone, on June 23, left a man in his thirties with wounds which were not life-threatening. Although the SPD was reportedly investigating, the victim refused to provide information about the attack or a description of the shooter.

June 29 
The fifth shooting near the zone occurred in the early morning of June 29. A 16-year-old black male, Antonio Mays Jr., was killed and a 14-year-old male was in critical condition with gunshot wounds. Mays was a resident of San Diego, California and reportedly left home for Seattle a week earlier. On video, a series of 12 or 13 gunshots is heard at 2:54 a.m., just before a voice warns of "multiple vehicles", "multiple shooters" and a "stolen white Jeep" as protesters scrambled into position. After a five-minute lull, another 18 gunshots are heard as the "white Jeep" crashes into a barricade or a portable toilet. Some witnesses said they believed that shots were being fired from the vehicle, but no evidence has emerged to support this.

During its investigation, the SPD discovered that the crime scene had been disturbed. Police made no arrests in any of the shootings since June 20. According to a volunteer medic who witnessed the incident, CHOP security forces shot at the SUV driven by the teenagers after it crashed into a concrete barrier.

Reaction

Local 
Durkan called the zone an attempt to "de-escalate interactions between protesters and law enforcement", and Best said that her officers would look at approaches to "reduce [their] footprint" in the Capitol Hill neighborhood. City Council member Kshama Sawant spoke to occupants of Cal Anderson Park on June 8 and urged protesters to turn the precinct into a community center for restorative justice.

Assistant police chief Deanna Nollette said in a June 10 news conference, "We're trying to get a dialogue going so we can figure out a way to resolve this without unduly impacting the citizens and the businesses that are operating in that area." Nollette said that police had received reports of "armed individuals" passing barricades set up by protesters as checkpoints, "intimidat[ing] community members", and police "heard anecdotally" of residents and businesses being asked to pay a fee to operate in the area: "This is the crime of extortion." The following day, Best said that police had not received "any formal reports" of extortion and the Greater Seattle Business Association said that it "found no evidence of this occurring". The New York Times reported in August that during the zone's existence, some small business owners were intimidated by demonstrators with baseball bats, asked to pledge loyalty to the movement and choose between CHOP and the police, put on a list of "cop callers", harassed, or threatened with death by a mob. A group of small-business owners sued the city for abandoning them and forcing them to pay private security companies to protect them.

On June 11, the SPD announced its desire to reenter the abandoned East Precinct building and said that it still operated in the zone; according to Washington governor Jay Inslee, the zone was "unpermitted" but "largely peaceful". The next day, Best said: "Rapes, robberies and all sorts of violent acts have been occurring in the area and we have not been able to get to it." During the early morning of June 12, Isaiah Thomas Willoughby, 36, of Tacoma but formerly of Seattle, set a fire at the East Precinct building and walked away; community residents extinguished it before it spread beyond the building's external wall or to nearby tents. Later that day, Durkan visited the zone and told a New York Times reporter that she was unaware of any serious crime reported in the area. Most of the people interviewed by Vox had participated in the protests but did not feel safe walking in the area at night, especially in late June. One Capitol Hill resident noted a difference in perspective between outsiders and residents: "I feel a lot of the current 'it's not safe' stuff comes from either people who aren't living in the neighborhood itself or from affluent new arrivals, or from business owners."

On June 16, an agreement was reached between CHOP representatives and the city to "rezone" the occupied area to allow better street access for businesses and local services. The next day, KING-TV reported that some residents were uneasy with the occupation near their homes: "What you want from a home is a stress-free environment. You want to be able to sleep well, you want to feel comfortable and we just don't feel comfortable right now." The station reported receiving anonymous emails from other residents expressing "real concerns". On June 18, black protesters reportedly expressed unease about the zone and its use of Black Lives Matter slogans. According to NPR, "Black activists say there must be follow-through to make sure their communities remain the priority in a majority-white protest movement whose camp has taken on the feel of a neighborhood block party that's periodically interrupted by chants of 'Black Lives Matter!

On June 22, Durkan and Best said in a press conference that police would reoccupy the East Precinct "peacefully and in the near future"; no specific timeline was given. CNN quoted "de facto CHOP leader" hip-hop artist Raz Simone two days later as saying that "a lot of people are going to leave; a lot of people already left" the zone.

That day, Durkan proposed a police hiring freeze and a $20 million cut to the SPD budget (about a 5% reduction for the rest of 2020) to compensate for a revenue shortfall and unforeseen expenses due to the pandemic. During a public-comment period, community members said that the budget cut should be larger and SPD funds should be redirected to housing and healthcare. Twelve businesses, residents and property owners filed a class-action lawsuit in federal court against the city, which they said had deprived them of due process by permitting the zone. Saying that they did not want "to undermine CHOP participants' message or present a counter-message", the plaintiffs alleged that their legal rights were "overrun" by the city's "unprecedented decision to abandon and close off an entire city neighborhood" and isolate them from city services. They sought compensation for property damage and lost business and property rights, and restoration of full public access. Community Roots Housing, a public development authority which owns 13 properties near the zone, called for its shutdown on June 30: "These residents have become victims of an occupation better characterized today by its violence, chaos and killings than anything else ... Forcing us to choose between anarchy and police brutality is a false dichotomy. Compassion and law-enforcement should not be mutually exclusive."

At 5:28 a.m. on July 1, Durkan issued an executive order that "gathering in this area [is] an unlawful assembly requiring immediate action from city agencies, including the Police Department." More than 100 police officers, with help from the FBI, moved into the area and tweeted a warning that anyone remaining or returning would be subject to arrest. Forty-four people were arrested by the end of the day, and another 25 were arrested overnight. The SPD posted a YouTube video depicting violent incidents in the Capitol Hill area. Police maintained roadblocks in the area and restricted access to local residents, workers and business owners; some of the latter alleged that the police presence discouraged customers.

National 
On June 9, U.S. Senator Ted Cruz said that the zone was "endangering people's lives". President Trump demanded the following day that Inslee and Durkan "take back" the zone, saying that if they did not do it, he would do it for them. Inslee condemned Trump's involvement in the situation, telling him to "stay out of Washington state's business". On Twitter, Trump criticized Inslee and Durkan and called the protesters "domestic terrorists", and Durkan told the president to "go back to [his] bunker", referring to his having been evacuated to the Presidential Emergency Operations Center during protests the previous month. Durkan said on June 11 that Trump wanted to construct a narrative about domestic terrorists with a radical agenda to fit his law-and-order initiatives, and that lawfully exercising the First Amendment right to demand more of society was patriotism, not terrorism.

USA Today called the zone a "protest haven", the World Socialist Web Site described the zone as an "anarchistic commune", and The Nation called it "an anti-capitalist vision of community sovereignty without police." Conservative commentator Guy Benson called the occupation of Capitol Hill "communist cosplay". Rosette Royale, writing for Rolling Stone, called the zone "a peaceful realm where people build nearly everything on the fly, as they strive to create a world where the notion that black lives matter shifts from being a slogan to an ever-present reality." Tobias Hoonhout, writing for National Review, contrasted the mainstream media coverage of the zone, which he deemed sympathetic, to the negative coverage of the 2016 Malheur National Wildlife Refuge occupation. Gregory J. Wallance, writing for The Hill, called the zone "a cautionary tale for police defunding".

Fox News's website posted photographs purportedly from the zone on June 12, include a man with an assault rifle from an earlier Seattle protest and smashed windows from other parts of Seattle. The website posted an article about protests in Seattle whose accompanying photo, of a burning city, had been taken in Saint Paul, Minnesota, the previous month. According to The Washington Post, "Fox's coverage contributed to the appearance of armed unrest". The manipulated and misleading photos were removed, with Fox News saying that it "regret[ted] these errors". Monty Python alumnus John Cleese tweeted on June 15, after a Fox News anchorwoman read a Reddit post on-air indicating purported "signs of rebellion" within the zone, that the post was a joke referring to a scene in Monty Python and the Holy Grail.

Activists in other cities sought to replicate the autonomous zone in their communities; police stopped protesters in Portland, Oregon, and Asheville, North Carolina. Governor of Tennessee Bill Lee condemned attempts to create an autonomous area in Nashville on June 12, warning protesters in the state that "autonomous zones and violence will not be tolerated." In Philadelphia, a group established an encampment which was compared to the Seattle occupation; however, the group's focus was on protesting Philadelphia's anti-homelessness laws. In what CNN called "an apparent reference to the Capitol Hill Autonomous Zone (CHAZ) in Seattle," protesters spray-painted "BHAZ" (Black House Autonomous Zone) on June 22 on the pillars of St. John's Episcopal Church, across the street from Lafayette Square in Washington, D.C. The next day, Trump tweeted: "There will never be an 'Autonomous Zone' in Washington, D.C., as long as I'm your President. If they try they will be met with serious force!" Twitter cited Trump's tweet for violating the company's policy against abusive behavior: "specifically the presence of a threat of harm against an identifiable group."

Politico reported that CHOP "was a recurring theme throughout" debate by the U.S. House Judiciary Committee of the Democratic-sponsored police reform bill, on June 17. Representative Debbie Lesko proposed an amendment to cut off federal police grants to any municipality which permits an autonomous zone. Pramila Jayapal, whose district includes the CHOP, blamed Fox News and "right-wing media pundits" for spreading misinformation. The bill was passed by a majority-Democratic vote.

On July 1, referring to the expulsion of protesters from the zone that day by police, U.S. Attorney General William Barr praised Best "for her courage and leadership in restoring the rule of law in Seattle." White House Press Secretary Kayleigh McEnany said, "I am pleased to inform everyone that Seattle has been liberated ... Anarchy is anti-American, law and order is essential, peace in our streets will be secured." The next day, Trump said: "I'm glad to see, in Seattle, they took care of the problem, because as they know, we were going in to take. We were ready to go in and they knew that too. And they went in and they did what they had to do."

Aftermath 

Street protests continued after the zone was cleared. The SPD reported vandalism in the Capitol Hill area during the night of July 19; fireworks were thrown into the East Precinct, starting a small fire which was rapidly extinguished. Donnitta Sinclair Martin, the mother of Lorenzo Anderson, filed a wrongful death claim against the city that the police and fire department had failed to protect or provide medical assistance for her son and city decisions had created a dangerous environment.

A group of 150 people returned to the Capitol Hill neighborhood late at night on July 23 and vandalized several businesses, including a shop owned by a relative of a police officer who fatally shot Charleena Lyles (a pregnant black woman) at home in 2017. On July 25, several thousand protesters gathered in the Capitol Hill neighborhood for demonstrations in solidarity with Portland, Oregon. Tensions had escalated in Portland in early July after the Trump administration deployed federal forces against the wishes of local officials, sparking controversy and regenerating the protests. The Department of Homeland Security deployed an undisclosed number of federal agents in Seattle on July 23, without notifying local officials, adding to resident unease. An initially peaceful march during the early afternoon of July 25 by the Youth Liberation Front was designated a riot by the SPD after several businesses were destroyed, fires were started in five construction trailers near a future juvenile detention center, and the vehicles of several center employees were vandalized. Forty-seven people were arrested, and 21 police officers were injured. According to Crosscut, many protesters had participated in the understanding that the march's central issues (police brutality and federal overreach) were connected.

The New York Times reported on August 7 that weeks after the protests, several blocks remained boarded up and many business owners were afraid to speak out about their experiences. Carmen Best resigned as the chief of police three days later, after the Seattle City Council voted to downsize the department by up to 100 out of its 1,400 officers. On Monday, August 24, following a night of protest against the police shooting of Jacob Blake in Wisconsin, Desmond David-Pitts, 19, of Alaska, helped set a fire against the sally-port door of the East Precinct, while others attempted to bar the door so police could not escape. There was no significant damage but they soon erected temporary cement barrier walls which were later replaced by a tall security fence, to prevent further access to the building. Public hearings about the fate of the zone's public art and community garden began in August, and were expected to continue for several months.

On December 16, 2020, an expected third "sweep" of the park was met with resistance by the community. People created makeshift barriers and thwarted SPD's attempts to enter the park. While a federal court considered a temporary restraining order preventing the city from raiding the park, protesters took advantage of the turnout to occupy a private building owned by a real estate developer across the street from the northern end of the park.

References

External links 

 Live stream – The Stranger via YouTube
 Video and graphic visualizations of Capitol Hill conflict, at the Western barricade, New York Times, June 26, 2020

2020 establishments in Washington (state)
2020 disestablishments in Washington (state)
2020 in Seattle
Black Lives Matter
Capitol Hill, Seattle
Cooperatives in the United States
Counterculture communities
Deaths by firearm in Washington (state)
Far-left politics in the United States
George Floyd protests in Seattle
Protest camps
June 2020 events in the United States
July 2020 events in the United States
Populated places established in 2020
Populated places disestablished in 2020
Micronations
Protests in Seattle
Riots and civil disorder in Washington (state)
Separatism in the United States
Urban politics in the United States
Secessionist organizations in the United States